Seminole High School is a public high school located in Seminole, Texas (USA) and classified as a 4A school by the UIL.  It is part of the Seminole Independent School District located in central Gaines County.  In 2015, the school was rated "Met Standard" by the Texas Education Agency.

Academics
UIL Academic Meet Champions 
1993(3A), 1994(3A), 2002(3A)

Athletics
The Seminole Indians compete in these sports - 

Cross Country, Volleyball, Football, Basketball, Powerlifting, Golf, Tennis, Track, Softball & Baseball

State Titles
Boys Basketball - 
1955(2A), 1979(2A)
Boys Track - 
1948(1A)
Volleyball - 
1971(3A), 1976(3A), 1977(3A)

State Finalists
Baseball - 
1962(3A)
Boys Basketball - 
1957(2A), 1963(2A), 1999(3A)
Volleyball - 
1978(3A), 1979(2A), 1982(3A), 1983(3A)

Band
Marching Band Swepstakes Champions 
1981(3A)

Theater
One Act Play 
2014(3A), 2015(4A)

State Finalists 
1993(3A) 1994(3A), 1995(3A), 1996(3A), 1997(3A)

Alumni
Marcus Haddock, opera singer

References

External links
Seminole ISD

Schools in Gaines County, Texas
Public high schools in Texas